Tienen is a railway station in the town of Tienen, Flemish Brabant, Belgium. The station opened on 22 September 1837 and is located on line 36. The train services are operated by National Railway Company of Belgium (NMBS).

The station building dates from 1841 and is the oldest station building in Belgium that is still in existence.

Tienen used to be located on 22 (to Diest) and 142 (to Namur). These two lines were closed between 1967 and 1990 and are now cycle routes.

Train services
The station is served by the following services:

Intercity services (IC-03) Knokke/Blankenberge - Bruges - Ghent - Brussels - Leuven - Hasselt - Genk
Intercity services (IC-14) Quiévrain - Mons - Braine-le-Comte - Brussels - Leuven - Liege (weekdays)
Intercity services (IC-29) De Panne - Ghent - Aalst - Brussels - Brussels Airport - Leuven - Landen

References

External links
 

Railway stations in Belgium
Railway stations in Flemish Brabant
Railway stations in Belgium opened in 1837